Fight Factory Pro Wrestling is an Irish professional wrestling promotion run by Phil Boyd on 16 May 2004 and based in Ireland. FFPW promotion tours theatres, leisure centres, and town halls.

History

Fight Factory Pro Wrestling was an Affiliated with NWA UK Hammerlock until 2012. and Union of European Wrestling Alliances since 2011 and Pro Wrestling Zero1 since 2012

Championships

Champions

Notable roster
Rebecca Knox
Scotty 2 Hotty
Jordan Devlin
Aoife Valkyrie

See also

Professional wrestling in the United Kingdom
List of professional wrestling promotions in Europe

References

External links

Irish professional wrestling promotions
2004 establishments in Ireland
Entertainment companies established in 2004
Pro Wrestling Zero1